I-Bankers Direct  operates an online funding platform that provides accredited individual investors with the ability to evaluate and invest in early-stage companies. The platform provides access to video presentations, offering documents, management conference calls, company slide decks and other decision-making support.

The company is headquartered in New York City, and maintains offices in Palo Alto, California and Lugano, Switzerland. It was founded in 2012 by entrepreneurs and investment banking professionals Mike McCrory and John Kallassy with the goal of transforming the process of investing in growth-stage companies.

References

 Crowdfund Insider, July 18, 2013: "Crowdfunding Platform I-Bankers Direct Comments on General Solicitation, Looks to the Future of Equity Crowdfunding"
 San Francisco Business Times, June 18, 2013: "Crowdfunding site I-Bankers Direct expands into Palo Alto"
 Greenwich Time, June 7, 2013: "New Stamford firm specializes in crowd funding for companies"
 Upstart Business Journal, May 23, 2013: "Investment bankers follow the crowd... funding"

External links
I-Bankers website

Defunct crowdfunding platforms of the United States